SIHS is an abbreviation, acronym, or initialism that may refer to:

 Summer Institute of Hispanic Studies in Clinton, NY, USA
 Symbiosis Institute of Health Sciences in Pune, India
 Sherman Indian High School in Riverside, California
 Shalamar Institute of Health Sciences in Shalimar Town, Lahore, Pakistan
 St Ives High School in Sydney, Australia
 South Iredell High School in Troutman, North Carolina